= Sadrol Mamalek Ardabili =

Sadrolmamalek Ardabili (Persian: صدرالممالک اردبیلی) was one of the scholars of 19th century (13th century АН). He was so gifted in language eloquence that made him a learned scholar of his era. Finished his primary education in Ardabil and completed it in Isfahan. Entered into Qajar court as teacher of Mohammd Mirza, son of Abbas Mirza, who became king after Fathali Shah in the name of Mohammd Shah and then during his reign, appointed as a minister.

Ardabili died in 1271 Hegria (1854/1855), and his body moved to Karbala.

His pen-name was Nosrat (meaning victory). "Masnavi" and "Nosrat" are of poetical works.

== See also ==
- Ardabil in the crossing of the history by Baba Safari.
